Silver Bullets is an album by New Zealand group the Chills, released in 2015.

Phillipps spoke of the 19-year gap since their previous album. "We just couldn't. There's been a lot of frustration but finally, somebody got behind us with the money and belief in both me and the band. It all happened quite quickly too. Off it went!'"

Reception

Pitchfork said, "guitars wreathed in reverb, organs heaving, Phillipps' voice, as quietly assured as ever. Combining delicate grace with ornate detailing is no easy feat, but on Silver Bullets, Phillipps manages it again and again."

The Guardian said, "The Chills' appeal always lay in their ability to combine brightness and murkiness – they sound almost like the musical embodiment of autumn, part windswept and part golden – and that's very much present on Silver Bullets, a minor triumph of an album." Drowned in Sound noted, "the mini cinemas of Silver Bullets showcase all of The Chills' true strengths. Their heroic compassion inspires love, preaches empathy, sustains life. Praise them as saints."

Track listing 
All songs written by Martin Phillipps.

 "Father Time" – 0:34
 "Warm Waveform" – 4:10
 "Silver Bullets" – 3:58
 "Underwater Wasteland" – 5:27
 "America Says Hello" – 5:05
 "Liquid Situation" – 0:50
 "Pyramid / When the Poor Can Reach the Moon" – 8:03
 "Aurora Corona" – 4:28
 "I Can't Help You" – 3:10
 "Tomboy" – 4:42
 "Molten Gold" – 3:25

References 

2018 albums
The Chills albums
Fire Records (UK) albums